Vilmos Göttler (born 22 December 1951) is a Hungarian equestrian. He competed in the individual jumping event at the 1992 Summer Olympics.

References

External links
 

1951 births
Living people
Hungarian male equestrians
Olympic equestrians of Hungary
Equestrians at the 1992 Summer Olympics
People from Békéscsaba
Sportspeople from Békés County